The 2018 AFF Women's Championship was the tenth edition of the AFF Women's Championship, an international women's football tournament organised by the ASEAN Football Federation (AFF). The tournament was hosted by Indonesia from 30 June to 13 July 2018.

Thailand won their third title in a row, and their fourth title in total, by beating Australia U20 3–2 in the final.

Venues

Squads

Group stage 
All times listed are Indonesia Western Standard Time (UTC+07:00)

Group A

Group B

Knockout stage

Semi-finals

Third place match

Final

Awards

Goalscorers
10 goals

 Mary Fowler

8 goals

 Pitsamai Sornsai

7 goals

 Alex Chidiac
 Win Theingi Tun

6 goals

 Hout Koemhong
 Kanjana Sungngoen
 Rattikan Thongsombut
 Suchawadee Nildhamrong
 Huỳnh Như
 Nguyễn Thị Tuyết Dung
 Nguyễn Thị Vạn

4 goals

 Phạm Hải Yến

3 goals

 Kyra Cooney-Cross
 MelindaJ Barbieri
 Amy Sayer
 Ban Cheavey
 Norsuriani Mazli
 July Kyaw
 Khin Moe Wai
 Orathai Srimanee
 Sudarat Chuchuen
 Nguyễn Thị Thúy Hằng

2 goals

 Cortnee Vine
 Nilar Win
 Yee Yee Oo
 Joyce Semacio
 Alisa Rukpinij
 Silawan Intamee
 Phạm Hoàng Quỳnh
 Thái Thị Thảo
 Quinley Quezada

1 goal

 Emily Condon
 Bethany Gordon
 Princess Ibini
 Rachel Lowe
 Holly McNamara
 Courtney Nevin
 Susan Phonsongkham
 Tori Tumeth
 Poeum Kunthea
 Norn Minea
 Chay Sreyleab
 Mayang Mayang
 Syenida Meryfandina
 Yudith Herlina
 Zahra Musdalifah
 Haindee Mosroh
 Jaciah Jumilis
 Norhanisa Yahya
 Sihaya Ajad
 Usliza Usman
 Khin Marlar Tun
 Khin Mo Mo Tun
 Naw Ar Lo Wer Phaw
 Thandar Moe
 Kyla Inquig
 Nipawan Panyosuk
 Hoàng Thị Loan

1 own goal

 Nur Umairah (against Philippines)
 Maria Da Conceição (against Thailand)

Final ranking

References

W
2018
AFF Women's Championship
International association football competitions hosted by Indonesia
2018 in women's association football